Epsom Down in the southern town outlands of Epsom was used as a venue for two first-class cricket matches between 1816 and 1819. Both were between the local Epsom Cricket Club and the Hampshire county team. The approximate site is Epsom Downs Racecourse.

References

External links
 Epsom Down at Cricinfo

1816 establishments in England
Cricket grounds in Surrey
Defunct cricket grounds in England
Defunct sports venues in Surrey
English cricket in the 19th century
Epsom and Ewell
Sport in Surrey
Sports venues completed in 1816
Sports venues in Surrey